The Miracle Baby is a 1923 American silent Western film directed by Val Paul and starring Harry Carey. With no prints of The Miracle Baby located in any film archives, it is a lost film.

Cast
 Harry Carey as Neil Allison
 Margaret Landis as Judy Stanton
 Charles J.L. Mayne as 'Hopeful' Mason
 Edward Hearn as Hal Norton
 Hedda Nova as Violet
 Edmund Cobb as Jim Starke
 Alfred Allen as Dr. Amos Stanton
 Bert Sprotte as Sam Brodford

Production
Location scenes with snow were filmed at Truckee, California.

See also
 Harry Carey filmography

References

External links
 
 
 Lobby card at Getty Images

1923 films
1923 Western (genre) films
American black-and-white films
Films directed by Val Paul
Film Booking Offices of America films
Silent American Western (genre) films
1920s American films